Football Association of Maldives (FAM) Awards is organised by the Football Association of Maldives.

Golden Boot

Best Player

Best Club

Best Woman Player

Three most recognised Referees

Best Youth Player

Club with highest attendance

FAM President's Award

Popular Player (via fans' SMS)

Fairplay Player

Best Goalkeeper

Special Contribution Award

Special Recognition Award

References

Association football trophies and awards
Maldivian awards
Football in the Maldives